New Kowloon is an area in Hong Kong, bounded in the south by Boundary Street, and in the north by the ranges of the Eagle's Nest, Beacon Hill, Lion Rock, Tate's Cairn and Kowloon Peak. It covers the present-day Kwun Tong District and Wong Tai Sin District, and part of the Sham Shui Po District and Kowloon City District.

The name of this area is rarely used in day to day life. Areas that belongs to New Kowloon are usually referred to as part of Kowloon. However, in land leases, it is common to refer to land lots in lot numbers as "New Kowloon Inland Lot number #".

History

By the Convention of Peking in 1860, the territory of British-owned Kowloon was defined as area in Kowloon Peninsula south of Boundary Street (known as Kowloon, inclusive of Stonecutter's Island), which was ceded by the Qing Empire (Ch'ing Empire, Manchu Empire) to the United Kingdom under the Convention.

On the other hand, the territory north of Boundary Street (later known as New Kowloon) remained part of Qing Empire until it was leased as part of the New Territories to the UK in 1898 for 99 years under the Convention for the Extension of Hong Kong Territory (also known as the Second Convention of Peking). The area of New Kowloon was defined in statutory law first in November 1900 (and referred to as such) and again in December 1937  In practice, nevertheless, both the areas to the south and to the north of Boundary Street (i.e. both Kowloon and New Kowloon), from the Lei Yue Mun strait in the east to Mei Foo Sun Chuen and Lai Chi Kok Bay in the west, are collectively known as "Kowloon". For example, a postal address in Kwun Tong will identify "Kowloon" as its regional destination, even though it is technically in New Kowloon and not part of Kowloon as statutorily defined.

Current situation
In modern-day conversations, the term "New Kowloon" is now rarely heard in Hong Kong. New Kowloon is no longer regarded as part of the New Territories, but as a part of the Kowloon urban area beyond Boundary Street. Nevertheless, the legal definitions of Kowloon, New Kowloon and New Territories remain unchanged - New Kowloon has remained legally part of the New Territories instead of Kowloon. On 1 July 1997, the territories on both sides of Boundary Street (ceded and leased respectively) were transferred to China, along with the rest of Hong Kong.

However, the designation "New Kowloon" still has some legal implications. Almost all lands of Hong Kong are government land (known as crown land in Commonwealth countries and before 1997 in Hong Kong), while all crown leases (now known as government leases in Hong Kong) of New Kowloon and New Territories lands had been expired on 27 June 1997, but automatically extended up to 30 June 2047 due to the Sino-British Joint Declaration. This renewal implies that, all privately owned land leases of New Kowloon, has to pay government rent (crown rent in Commonwealth countries) as leases in the rest of the New Territories, and unlike the rest of the Kowloon. Most Kowloon land leases (Kowloon south of the Boundary Street) are not required to pay the government rent to the government, unless they are new leases, or are old leases having been renewed and such clauses have been inserted in the renewed lease contract.

The land reclaimed from the Kowloon Bay water body, such as Kai Tak, are also referred as part of New Kowloon in land leases, although these lots do not appear to be included in the 1937 map.

See also
 History of Hong Kong

References

External links

Definition of New Kowloon in the Laws of Hong Kong as defined in 1937, Cap 1 SCHED 5, Hong Kong Laws. 
 Land Tenure System in Hong Kong - Legislative Council

 
Populated places in Hong Kong
Kowloon
New Territories